A deputy chief of space operations is a senior leadership position in the United States Space Force. There are four deputy chiefs of space operations in the Space Force, staffed either by a lieutenant general or a senior executive service personnel. They are the service's equivalent to the Army's and Air Force's deputy chiefs of staff, the Marine Corps' deputy commandants, and the Navy's deputy chiefs of naval operations. They are part of the Office of the Chief of Space Operations and hold office at the Pentagon.

The proposed organizational structure of the Space Force's headquarters was first revealed in a February 2020 congressional report, with directors instead of deputy chiefs of space operations. Intending to be "lean and agile", the service consolidated the normal nine functional areas into three directorates. In a June 2020 draft proposal, the position was renamed deputy chiefs of staff. On July 29, 2020, the first two deputy chiefs of operations were nominated. The Space Force adopted C-suite titles in designing their senior leadership positions.

Deputy Chief of Space Operations for Human Capital 

The deputy chief of space operations for human capital (S1 or SF/CHCO) is the chief human capital officer of the Space Force. The CHCO directs the Space Force's personnel management, which encompasses force structure analysis, personnel programs, civilian personnel, readiness, senior officer matters, quality force issues, equal opportunity, and family support.

Deputy Chief of Space Operations for Intelligence 
The deputy chief of space operations for intelligence (S2) is the senior intelligence officer of the Space Force. The S2 has intelligence policy, oversight, and guidance of Space Force intelligence, surveillance and reconnaissance capabilities. The S2 is responsible for the Space Force Intelligence Community Element to the United States Intelligence Community and is the chief of the Service Cryptologic Component with delegated authorities from the Director of the National Security Agency.

Deputy Chief of Space Operations for Operations, Cyber, and Nuclear 

The deputy chief of space operations for operations, cyber, and nuclear (S3/4/6/7/10 or SF/COO) is the chief operations officer of the Space Force. The COO has overall responsibility for the Space Force's operations, intelligence, sustainment, cyber, and nuclear operations.

Deputy Chief of Space Operations for Strategy, Plans, Programs, Requirements, and Analysis 

The deputy chief of space operations for strategy, plans, programs, requirements, and analysis (S5/8 or SF/CSRO) is the chief strategy and resourcing officer of the Space Force. The CSRO has overall responsibility for the Space Force's strategies, requirements, and budget.

Deputy Chief of Space Operations for Technology and Innovation 

The deputy chief of space operations for technology and innovation (S9 or SF/CTIO) is the chief technology and innovation officer of the Space Force.

See also 
 Director of Staff of the United States Space Force
 Space Staff
 United States Space Force

References

Notes

References 

United States Space Force generals
Office of the Chief of Space Operations personnel